William Scheves (sometimes modernized to Chivas or Shivas) (died 1497)  was the second Archbishop of St. Andrews. His parentage is obscure, but he was probably the illegitimate son of a royal clerk, John Scheves. Sixteenth-century accounts claim he spent several years abroad and studied at the University of Louvain. He spent several years at the University of St Andrews as an administrator. In his earlier ecclesiastical career, he had been clericus regiae (royal cleric) and master of the hospital of Brechin. In 1474 he was provided unsuccessfully to the Archdeaconry of Dunblane, but by the beginning of 1477 he was Archdeacon of St Andrews and coadjutor (successor) and vicar-general of the archdiocese. After the deposition of Archbishop Patrick Graham in 1478, he succeeded to the archbishopric, apparently receiving the papal pall while in the presence of King James III and many of the nobility at Holyrood.

His rapid rise from junior clergyman to archbishop of St Andrews with a powerful role at court appears to have generated resentment from both ecclesiastical and lay rivals. As a result, he has been associated with the so-called "low-born favourites" or "familiars" who sixteenth-century chroniclers alleged surrounded James III in the years before 1482. Yet Scheves was not especially 'low-born', and was probably the illegitimate son of a former clerk register, John Scheves. There is little doubt, nevertheless, that he had an unusual level of influence with the King until the Lauder coup of 1482. In a highly unusual practice, he is found countersigning royal letters regularly in the later 1470s. After the coup, he was briefly disgraced, and although he was restored to favour after the king regained power in 1483, his influence was not what it had been.

George Buchanan, writing approximately a century later, claimed that Scheves studied medicine and astronomy at Louvain University; he certainly practised as a physician, and was acting as court physician for the king by 1471. He had an extensive library of medical texts and also had a keen interest in astrology. He was "one of the earliest book collectors on the grand scale in Scotland."

The archbishop was given connections to the Christian areas of the Mediterranean under Ottoman control. He was styled "Bishop of Delphi", and his subordinate, James Lindsay, was appointed "Bishop of Dionysias" as a suffragan of the Archbishop of St. Andrews. William's name is even noted in one Greek chronicle.

In the Arbuthnott Missal there is a striking full-page miniature painting of St Ternan, patron saint of the church of Arbuthnott, which is modelled on William Scheves, and can claim to be one of the earliest Scottish portraits.

The Italian merchant Jerome Frescobaldi was the factor for his foreign debts, and received payments from the merchant and Conservator of Scottish Privileges Andrew Halyburton.

Scheves died on 28 January 1497.

References

Further reading
Dowden, John, The Bishops of Scotland, ed. J. Maitland Thomson, (Glasgow, 1912).

15th-century births
1497 deaths
Archbishops of St Andrews
15th-century Roman Catholic archbishops in Scotland
Chancellors of the University of St Andrews
Bibliophiles

Year of birth unknown